The third umpire (or TV Umpire) is an off-field umpire used in some cricket matches, particularly international matches. Their role is to make the final decision in questions referred to them by the two on-field umpires or the players.

The third umpire is also there to act as an emergency on-field umpire if required.

History

The third umpire was conceptualized by former Sri Lankan domestic cricketer, and current cricket writer Mahinda Wijesinghe.

It debuted in Test cricket in November 1992 at Kingsmead, Durban for the South Africa vs. India series. Karl Liebenberg was the third umpire with Cyril Mitchley the on-field umpire, referring the run-out decision in this match. Sachin Tendulkar became the first batsman to be dismissed (run out) by using television replays in the second day of the Test scoring 11.

Appointment

The third umpire is appointed from the Elite Panel of ICC Umpires or the International Panel of ICC Umpires for Test matches, ODIs, and T20Is.

For all Test matches, and for ODIs where DRS is used, the third umpire is appointed by the ICC, and is a different nationality to the two sides. For ODIs where DRS is not used, and for all T20Is, the third umpire is appointed by the home side's Governing body.

Functions

Decision requests

An on-field umpire can, at his own discretion, use a radio link to refer particular types of close decision to the third umpire, this is called an Umpire Review. When the full Umpire Decision Review System is not in use, the third umpire uses television replays (only) to assist him in coming to a decision.

When the full DRS is in use, players can also initiate reviews of particular decisions by the on-field umpires, this is called a Player Review. These are judged by the third umpire, and the third umpire has the full range of technology available beyond simple replays, for both Umpire Reviews and Player Reviews.

Emergency on-field umpire

In the case of injury or illness to one of the on-field umpires, the third umpire will take his place. The third umpire duties will then be taken on by the Fourth umpire.

For example, during the 4th ODI between Australia and India at Canberra in 2015–16, umpire Richard Kettleborough was injured during Australia's innings and was replaced by third umpire Paul Wilson.

References

See also
Fourth umpire
Instant replay in Major League Baseball

Cricket terminology
Cricket umpiring
Cricket laws and regulations